Alexis Kanner (born Henri Alex Kanner; 2 May 1942 – 13 December 2003) was a French born-Canadian film and television actor, based in England. His most notable role was the "Living in Harmony" episode of The Prisoner.

Biography
Henri Alex Kanner was born in Nazi-occupied Bagnères-de-Luchon, France, to a Jewish family.  In April 1944, shortly before his second birthday, he escaped with his family to Montreal, Canada, on the Portuguese ship Serpa Pinto. Kanner attended the Montreal Children's Theatre under the tutelage of Dorothy Davis and Violet Walters.

Kanner made his first impression as an actor in the role of Alex, among a French Canadian cast, in the television drama series Beau Temps, Mauvais Temps (1955–1958).

He moved to England in the late 50s to join the Birmingham Repertory Theatre to further his acting career. This led to the Royal Court and the Royal Shakespeare Company where he played in The Tempest in 1961 and the lead role in Hamlet under the direction of Peter Brook in 1965. His earliest UK television appearance appears to have been as Peter in the Sunday Night Theatre play Echo From Afar in 1959.

He appeared as Stephen in the film Reach for Glory (1962) about the brutal war games of evacuated teenage boys during the Second World War. This led to him first meeting the film's assistant director David Tomblin, who would a few years later be the producer of The Prisoner series.

He had a small role in the comedy film We Joined the Navy (1962) playing Gerrett. The only real notable thing about the film was the number of future British small screen comedy stalwarts who were acting in either similar small roles or uncredited cameos.

Other plays in which he performed were:
 ITV Play of the Week: Birds in the Wilderness as Peter (1962) and The Facing Chair (1963) as Clem Goodwin
 Television Playhouse: The Interview as The Young Man (1962) and Along Came A Spider as Brian (1963)
 Drama '63: The Freewheelers as Jeremy (1963)
 Armchair Theatre: Living Image (1963) as John Manders playing a son who wonders if he can love his father even though he violently disapproves of everything he stands for

He appeared on British television in an episode of The Saint, "The Ever Loving Spouse" (1964) as Alec Misner and in the first of three episodes in ATV's Love Story, A Future Holiday as Frank Watkins. His other appearances in that series were in the following year in Briefly Kiss The Loser as Big Silver Gardner and in 1967 as Colin Turner in Cinéma Vérité. He appeared as Detective Constable Matt Stone in 9 episodes of Softly, Softly (BBC, 1966), a spin-off series from Z-Cars. He claimed in interviews later that he left not wanting to be typecast. Only one complete Softly, Softly episode featuring Kanner survives in the BBC archives, 'A-Z' (broadcast 30 March 1966), and another partially.

His film career continued with an appearance in The Amorous Adventures of Moll Flanders (1965) as part of a Mohocks gang.

In 1967 he returned to Montreal to star as the lead character Ernie Turner in the film The Ernie Game which was written and directed by Don Owen for the National Film Board of Canada.

The Prisoner
Kanner's performances in the 1967–1968 British television series The Prisoner brought lasting recognition for his acting. When he was first enrolled, Patrick McGoohan, the star and co-creator of the series, was planning the final four episodes. There was some opposition to the choice, but McGoohan was looking to cast the rebellious and maverick qualities that Kanner displayed. His first guest-star role was in the mock Wild West episode "Living in Harmony", in which he portrayed the "Kid" (the alter-ego of Number Eight), a violent mute dressed in circus pants and a top hat, who is eventually shot in a duel by McGoohan's character, Number Six. McGoohan was impressed by his acting skills and perfectionism (to prepare the duel scene, both actors practised quick-draw assiduously). As a result, McGoohan wrote for Kanner the role of Number Forty-eight, who is made to stand trial as the representative of rebellious youth in "Fall Out", the final episode of the series. Additionally, Kanner gave an uncredited performance as the photographer in the fairy tale episode "The Girl Who Was Death", in which he performed a number of stunts on a roller coaster.

Later career
In 1969, he starred as Graham Baird in the little-known short feature film Twenty Nine, a story of a promiscuous young husband's night out in swinging London. It was only 26 minutes long and co-starred Yootha Joyce. This was shown as the B film in Britain with the feature film If..... The band Tuesday's Children, who had a cameo role in a nightclub scene, released the song "She" that they played in it as a single soon afterwards.

He starred in a number of feature films soon after, including Crossplot (1969) with Roger Moore, Connecting Rooms (1970) with Bette Davis and Michael Redgrave, and Goodbye Gemini (also 1970).

He is wrongly credited with appearing in Invasion:UFO in 1972, a compilation film made up of the episodes from the TV series UFO made in 1970. He had appeared in an episode called The Cat with Ten Lives but no footage of this was used in the feature film.

He moved back to Canada and his next film was Mahoney's Last Stand (released in the US as Mahoney's Estate, 1972) with Sam Waterston and Maud Adams, which he also co-wrote and co-directed. The original motion picture soundtrack of the same name was recorded by Ronnie Lane (who was a friend of Kanner) and Ron Wood, then of The Faces. Other famous names who worked on the album included Pete Townshend and Kenney Jones.

He worked again with Patrick McGoohan on the Canadian hostage drama film Kings and Desperate Men, in which he starred as well as writing, producing and directing. He apparently spent two years editing the film which, although filmed in December 1977, did not premiere until the 1981 Montreal World Film Festival. During the late 80s Kanner sued the producers of the film Die Hard claiming that they stole the idea for that movie from this film (he lost).

His final known acting role was in Nightfall (released in 1988), a science-fiction film based on the Isaac Asimov story of the same name.

He settled back in London in 1996 and was working on a new film project called J R Profitt that never came to fruition.

Death
He died of a heart attack at his London home on 13 December 2003, aged 61. He had requested that his body be flown to and buried in Jerusalem, Israel, at the Mount of Olives.

Filmography
 Reach for Glory (1962)
 We Joined the Navy (1962)
 The Amorous Adventures of Moll Flanders (1965)
 The Ernie Game (1967)
 Crossplot (1969)
 Connecting Rooms (1970)
 Goodbye Gemini (1970)
 Mahoney's Last Stand (1972)
 Kings and Desperate Men (Shot in 1977, released in 1981)
 Nightfall (1988)

References

External links 
 
 Alexis Kanner obituary, The Stage (copy archived 30 June 2015)

1942 births
2003 deaths
English male stage actors
English male television actors
English male film actors
Jewish English male actors
Royal Shakespeare Company members